International Marine Contractors Association (IMCA) is a leading international trade association for the marine contracting industry. It is a not for profit organisation with members representing the majority of worldwide marine contractors in the oil and gas and renewable energy industries. IMCA was formed by the merger of the Association of Offshore Diving Contractors (AODC)  with the Dynamically Positioned Vessel Owners Association (DPVOA) in 1995.

Overview

IMCA represents over 800 member organisations in over 60 countries. IMCA's mission it to improve performance in the marine contracting industry by championing better regulation and delivering good practice and technical guidance to enhance operational integrity.

IMCA operates five geographic regional sections (in Asia-Pacific, North America, Europe & Africa, Middle East & India and South America).  IMCA has a full-time secretariat in London that organises and manages the various regional and technical committees which form the principal means to achieve its mission. The extensive committee structure consists of elected member representatives who are expert in their field of operation.

As a trade association, IMCA is required to comply with international competition law and represents the industry on national and international forums.

Publications and documents 
IMCA has developed a comprehensive body of knowledge in the form of a suite of over 250 published guidance documents, technical information notes, DVDs and safety promotional materials which are internationally recognised as authoritative and establish standards of good practice in the marine contracting industry.

IMCA has published guidance documents in the following fields:
Safety, Environment & Legislation
Competence & Training
Diving Division
Diving Medical Advisory Committee (DMAC)
Marine Division & DPVOA 
Offshore Survey Division
Remote Systems & Remotely operated vehicle Division

Diving Certification
IMCA provides an internationally recognised certification scheme for three specialist diving disciplines:
 Air Diving Supervisors.
 Bell Diving Supervisors.
 Life Support Technicians.

Events
IMCA organises an annual programme of meetings and events all over the world, including regional meetings, briefing sessions, technical seminars and workshops on specific industry related issues. The Association's flagship event takes place every two years with an agenda combining business and strategic issues featuring senior executives and technical sessions. IMCA also supports a number of conferences and exhibitions hosted by other organisations which share a common interest of its members.

History

1972 - Association of Offshore Diving Contractors AODC founded
1990 - Dynamically Positioned Vessel Owners Association DPVOA, and AODC Middle East Section founded
1995 - AODC and DPVOA merged to form IMCA 
1997 - Offshore Survey Division formed
1999 - Observer status granted at the International Maritime Organization
1999 - IMCA Asia-Pacific Section founded
2000 - Middle East Section extended to include India
2002 - Americas Deepwater Section founded (later to become Central & North America Section)
2003 - Europe & Africa Section founded
2009 - South America Section founded

Past IMCA Presidents
 2018-present: Iain Grainger McDermott International
 2017-2018: Harke Jan Meek, Heerema Marine Contractors
 2015–2016: Bruno Faure, Technip
 2013-2014: Massimo Fontolan, Saipem
 2011-2012: Andy Woolgar, Subsea 7
 2009-2010: Johan Rasmussen, Acergy
 2007-2008: Knut Boe, Technip
 2005-2006: Frits Janmaat, Allseas Group
 2003-2004: Steve Preston, Heerema Marine Contractors
 2001-2002: John Smith, Halliburton Subsea/Subsea 7
 1999-2000: Donald Carmichael, Coflexip Stena Offshore
 1997-1998: Hein Mulder, Heerema Marine Contractors
 1995-1996: Derek Leach, Coflexip Stena Offshore

References

External links
Official website

Civil engineering organizations
International trade associations
Underwater diving safety